Sergei Dmitrievich Barbashev (born July 26, 1992) is a Russian professional ice hockey player. He is currently an unrestricted free agent. He most recently played under contract for HC Sibir Novosibirsk of the Kontinental Hockey League (KHL).

Playing career
Barbashev made his KHL debut with HC CSKA Moscow during the 2010/11 KHL season. On June 17, 2013, he was taken 17th overall in the 2013 KHL Expansion Draft by Admiral Vladivostok, making him the youngest player taken in the draft at 21.

Barbashev was invited to Chicago Wolves training camp in 2015, in which his brother Ivan was also attending for the first time after being drafted in the 2014 NHL Entry Draft by the St. Louis Blues. He was released from training camp without a contract on October 4.

On 15 May 2017, Barbashev signed a two-year contract extension with Admiral. The following day he was traded to HC Sibir Novosibirsk for monetary compensation.

International play

Competing internationally with Team Russia, Barbashev won silver at the 2012 World Junior Ice Hockey Championships.

Personal life
Barbashev's brother Ivan plays professionally in the National Hockey League for the Vegas Golden Knights.

Career statistics

Regular season and playoffs

International

References

External links

1992 births
Living people
Admiral Vladivostok players
HC CSKA Moscow players
Krasnaya Armiya (MHL) players
Metallurg Novokuznetsk players
Russian ice hockey left wingers
HC Sibir Novosibirsk players
Ice hockey people from Moscow
Universiade medalists in ice hockey
Universiade gold medalists for Russia
Competitors at the 2015 Winter Universiade